Ultra Nature is a French themed television channel owned by Mediawan Thematics. Disseminated in ultra-high definition, it is devoted to animal documentaries, discovery, travel and extreme sports. Mediawan Thematics is partnering with The Explorers Network, an ultra-high definition content producer with the documentary series "The Explorers".

History
Ultra Nature began broadcasting on 19 May 2016 on the Livebox of Orange France.

It was announced on Twitter that the channel will stop broadcasting at the end of 2022.

Programming
Ultra Nature broadcasts movies from wildlife, discovery, travel and extreme sports.

References

External links
 

Mediawan Thematics
Television stations in France
Television channels and stations established in 2016
Television channels and stations disestablished in 2022
2016 establishments in France
2022 disestablishments in France
French-language television stations